The Irish manual alphabet is the manual alphabet used in Irish Sign Language. Compared with other manual alphabets based on the Latin alphabet, it has unusual forms for the letters G, K, L, P, and Q.

See also

  Fingerspelling

Manual alphabet
Latin-script representations